Anjana Appachana is a novelist of Indian origin who lives in the United States. She has written a book of short stories titled Incantations and a novel titled Listening Now. Her upcoming novel, Fear and Lovely, will be published in early 2023.

Career
Her first book Incantations and Other Stories was published in England by Virago in 1991 and in the US by Rutgers University Press in 1992. The book was reissued in India by Penguin in 2006. The stories in it are set in the early eighties in India. One of her short stories titled "Sharmaji" was included in Mirrorwork: Fifty Years of Indian Writing, a collection edited by Salman Rushdie and Elizabeth West. Appachana received the O. Henry Festival Prize and a creative writing fellowship from the National Endowment for the Arts in the US.

Her first novel and second book is titled Listening Now, and was published by Random House in 1997. In it, six women tell the story of two lovers, Padma and Karan, spanning sixteen years. The novel is set in Bangalore, Delhi and Lucknow. Speaking about the perception of women writing in India, she has said: "Writing is not deemed legitimate work by anyone. They assume that it can be put aside for anything and everything -- for housework, for house guests, for cooking... Now tell me, how many people who work outside the house do you know who would take time off from their work to cook a meal or do groceries or laundry or look after house guests? None, right?...That's because they work outside the house and because they have a regular income which apparently legitimizes their work." In the same interview, Appachana adds that a writer's life is comparatively more comfortable in America than in India.

See also 
 List of Indian writers

References

External links
Review by Meenakshi Mukherjee

Indian emigrants to the United States
American novelists of Indian descent
American women writers of Indian descent
American people of Kannada descent
Living people
Writers from Karnataka
People from Kodagu district
20th-century American novelists
American women novelists
Year of birth missing (living people)
20th-century American women writers
21st-century American women